My Daughter's Men (or The Dads are Watching) is a South Korean TV Show distributed by E Channel. It airs every Sunday night at 9:00 KST.

Format 
Celebrity dads watch their daughters’ dates with their boyfriends. What will the dads talk about, and how will they react as they watch their daughters’ relationships?

Host 
Main Host

Special Host

Cast

List of episodes and rating 
In the table below,  represent the lowest ratings and  represent the highest ratings.

Note: This program airs on a cable channel/pay TV which normally has a relatively smaller audience compared to free-to-air TV/public broadcasters (KBS, SBS, MBC and EBS)

References

External links
 My Daughter's Men 1
 My Daughter's Men 2
 My Daughter's Men 2
 My Daughter's Men 4

2017 South Korean television series debuts
Korean-language television shows
South Korean variety television shows
South Korean dating and relationship reality television series